Parkland High School or Parklands High School may refer to one of the following secondary schools:

 Parkland High School (Pennsylvania), Allentown, Pennsylvania
 Parkland High School (Texas), El Paso, Texas
 Parkland Magnet High School, Winston-Salem, North Carolina
 Parklands High School (Lancashire), Chorley, Lancashire
 Parklands High School, Liverpool, Speke, Liverpool, Mereyside
 Parklands High School (West Yorkshire), a former secondary school in Seacroft, Leeds, West Yorkshire
 Parklands High School (Burnie), a secondary school located on the North West Coast of Tasmania, Australia
 Parklands High School, Alberton, a secondary school located in Gauteng, South Africa.

See also 
 Parkland (disambiguation)
 Marjory Stoneman Douglas High School, Parkland, Florida
 Stoneman Douglas High School shooting, in 2018, in Parkland, Florida, USA; the Parkland High School shooting, which resulted in the deaths of 17 people, and injuries of 17 others
 Parkland Secondary School, North Saanich, Vancouver Island, British Columbia, Canada
 Parkland Secondary (Sidney, British Columbia)
 Parkland Middle School, Montgomery County, Maryland, USA